Stephanie Vogt and Jirka Lokaj were the defending champions but Lokaj decided not to participate.
Vogt played alongside Timo Kranz and defended the title by defeating Elaine Genovese and Matthew Asciak 7–6(8–6), 7–5 in the final.

Draw

Draw

References
 Main Draw

Mixed Doubles